Lineostroma is a genus of fungi in the family Venturiaceae; according to the 2007 Outline of Ascomycota, the placement in this family is uncertain. A monotypic genus, it contains the single species Lineostroma banksiae.

References

External links
Lineostroma at Index Fungorum

Venturiaceae
Monotypic Dothideomycetes genera